Francis Daniel Crean (28 February 1916 – 2 December 2008) was an Australian politician who served as a member of the House of Representatives from 1951 to 1977, representing the Labor Party. He was a minister in the Whitlam Government, including as Treasurer from 1972 to 1974 and Deputy Prime Minister for a few months in 1975.

Crean was born in Hamilton, Victoria. He attended Melbourne High School and the University of Melbourne, and subsequently worked as a tax accountant. Crean was elected to the Victorian Legislative Assembly in 1945. He lost his seat in 1947 and reclaimed it in 1949, but quit state politics two years later to stand at the 1951 federal election. Crean spent the first 21 years of his career in federal politics in opposition, albeit as a frontbencher for most of that time. He became Treasurer after the 1972 election, but economic uncertainty and factional considerations meant he was replaced by Jim Cairns after two years. He was instead appointed Minister for Overseas Trade. Crean held that position until the government's dismissal in 1975, and for its final six months was also deputy prime minister, replacing Cairns when he became embroiled in the Khemlani affair. He left politics at the 1977 election. His son, Simon Crean, was a Member of Parliament from 1990 to 2013.

Early life
Crean was born in Hamilton, Victoria, where his father was a bicycle-maker. Although his father was of Irish Catholic descent, Francis was raised in his mother's Presbyterian faith. He was known as Francis in his early life, but later changed his name to the less Irish Catholic-sounding Frank. He graduated from the University of Melbourne with degrees in arts and commerce and a diploma in public administration, and became an accountant and tax consultant.

In 1946, Crean married Mary Findlay, with whom he had three sons. One of these, Simon Crean, was the federal Labor leader from 2001 to 2003. Another, Dr. David Crean, became a minister in the state Labor government in Tasmania. His third son, Stephen, became lost while skiing and died in a blizzard near Charlotte Pass in August 1985. A massive search failed to find him. His remains were found more than two years later.

Politics

In 1945 Crean was elected to the Victorian Legislative Assembly, but was defeated in 1947. He was re-elected in 1949. He quit state politics in 1951, to stand for the safe Labor seat of Melbourne Ports in the House of Representatives. In Canberra, Crean advanced rapidly, since he was one of the few Labor members with formal qualifications in economics. Elected to the Opposition front-bench in 1956, he became, in effect, shadow Treasurer (although Labor did not have a formal shadow ministry until 1969). This position he held for 16 years. During the 1960s Crean was sometimes considered as a possible party leader, but his rather plodding public image meant that he was overtaken by Gough Whitlam, who became leader in 1967. When Whitlam finally led Labor to office at the 1972 election, Crean became Treasurer, although Whitlam had no real confidence in him. Crean's tenure coincided with the onset of high inflation and rising unemployment. He did not trust the orthodox economic advice he was getting from the Treasury, but he lacked the authority to challenge it. The leader of the Labor Left, Dr Jim Cairns, attacked Crean's policies in the Cabinet, and in December 1974 Whitlam gave Cairns the Treasury and moved Crean to the Trade portfolio.

In July 1975 Whitlam sacked Cairns over his involvement in the Loans Affair, and Crean was elected party Deputy Leader and Deputy Prime Minister in his place, defeating Kim Beazley Sr. 47 votes to 31, with Frank Stewart receiving 11 and Kep Enderby 4.

He held this position until the dismissal of the Whitlam government in November 1975. After the election he contested the leadership, polling 13 votes to Lionel Bowen's 14 and Whitlam's 36. He retired from parliament in 1977.

Later years
From 1978 to 2004, Crean was chairman of the New Hope Migrant and Refugee Centre. In July 2006 it was reported that he was too frail to travel interstate for Gough Whitlam's 90th birthday function.

Crean died following a short illness on 2 December 2008, the 36th anniversary of the election of the Whitlam government in 1972.

References

Bibliography

Frith, Marion (1995). "Family Politics--Like Father, Like Son." The Age. 24 June.
Griffiths, Tony (2005). Beautiful Lies: Australia From Menzies to Howard. Kent Town: Wakefield Press.
Smyth, Paul (1994). Australian Social Policy: The Keynesian Chapter. Sydney: New South Wales University Press.
Stewart Ian (1974). "Inflation Troubles Australian Labor Party." The New York Times. 8 October.
Trumbull, Robert (1973). "Problems Cloud Whitlam's Image." The New York Times. 4 February.

1916 births
2008 deaths
Australian Labor Party members of the Parliament of Australia
Australian people of Irish descent
Members of the Australian House of Representatives
Members of the Australian House of Representatives for Melbourne Ports
Deputy Prime Ministers of Australia
Members of the Cabinet of Australia
1975 Australian constitutional crisis
Treasurers of Australia
Victoria (Australia) state politicians
University of Melbourne alumni
People educated at Melbourne High School
Australian Presbyterians
20th-century Australian politicians
People from Hamilton, Victoria
Government ministers of Australia
Australian Army personnel of World War II